The 1982 Big Ten Conference baseball tournament was held at Old Illinois Field on the campus of the University of Illinois at Urbana–Champaign in Champaign, Illinois, from May 21 through 23. The top two teams from the regular season in each division participated in the double-elimination tournament, the second annual tournament sponsored by the Big Ten Conference to determine the league champion.  won their first tournament championship and earned the Big Ten Conference's automatic bid to the 1982 NCAA Division I baseball tournament

Format and seeding 
The 1982 tournament was a 4-team double-elimination tournament, with seeds determined by conference regular season winning percentage within each division. Ohio State claimed the top seed from the East by winning the season series over Michigan. The top seed from each division played the second seed from the opposite division in the first round.

Tournament

All-Tournament Team 
The following players were named to the All-Tournament Team.

Most Outstanding Player 
Terry Steinbach and Jeff King were named co-Most Outstanding Players. Steinbach was an outfielder for Minnesota while King was a catcher for Ohio State.

References 

Tournament
Big Ten baseball tournament
Big Ten Baseball Tournament
Big Ten baseball tournament